Zoo Tycoon 2 is a business simulation video game developed by Blue Fang Games and published by Microsoft Game Studios and MacSoft. Originally released for Microsoft Windows, Zoo Tycoon 2 is also available for Windows Mobile, PDA, and Mac OS X, although expansions are not included in the Mac version. A Nintendo DS version, titled Zoo Tycoon 2 DS, was released in 2008.

Similar to its predecessor, Zoo Tycoon, the objective is to build and operate a zoo by creating exhibits and aquariums, keeping guests and animals happy, and maintaining employees, finances, terrain, foliage and scenery.

Gameplay
The gameplay revolves around creating suitable exhibits for animals through habitat modifications (ground cover, water, elevation, foliage and rocks and a variety of items including food, enrichment and shelter) which fulfill the animal's needs (habitat, hunger, thirst, stimulation, privacy, sleep, social, exercise). Guests will visit the zoo to see the animals, and they also have needs that need to be fulfilled through scenery and buildings (hunger, thirst, bathroom, seating, entertainment).

Zoo Tycoon 2 features three gameplay modes: Campaign, Challenge and Freeform. In Campaign mode, the player plays through a scenario in an existing zoo and is assigned different goals to complete, such as achieving a certain fame level, caring for rescued animals, or breeding endangered species. In Challenge mode, the player starts a zoo from scratch and will be given random challenges which can be accepted or rejected. In both of these modes, players will have limited money to manage and will start with limited access to animals and items, with more becoming available as zoo fame level increases. The last mode, Freeform, allows the player create a zoo from scratch with unlimited money and access to all animals and items from the start.

Development 
After the success of Zoo Tycoon, a sequel was planned. Marketing materials showed an emphasis on 3D visuals, as well as the first person perspective and photo mode. The game's first person Guest Mode was added due to many fan requests to get "closer" to the animals. The Photo Mode and Zookeeper Mode were refined after developers found out that the player should be able to interact with the world while walking around. first person movement and controls were designed around first-person shooters, with developers citing Half-Life as an inspiration.

The game was also designed to be more freeform than Zoo Tycoon was, with developer Shawn Stone citing that habitat building in the first game was a formulaic process that was improved upon in the sequel. The game's terrain deformation and Biome Brush were implemented to give the player control over their habitats by making them unique and individual, while making them simple enough to not alienate players that weren't as interested in the details of building an exhibit.

The development team noted the change in conservation messages portrayed by zoos after the release of Zoo Tycoon, and worked to make Zoo Tycoon 2 feel up to date with current information and messaging. Expansion packs were built onto the original game up to four years after its initial release, with designer Linda Currie citing the team working on three expansions simultaneously during development. Updated mechanics in each expansion required changes to be made to all animals, to ensure that each expansion pack would not break the game. The team worked to make changes without altering the core systems in place, in order to make updates and QA testing easier, and with lower risk.

Marketing 
Publisher Microsoft Game Studios ran several promotions involving the game, including a competition allowing kids to "Become a Zoo Keeper for the day" in the UK, and a competition to find "America's Favorite Zoo" in the US, an online vote which would result in a $25,000 grant from Microsoft to be put towards upkeep and maintenance. The contest consisted of three rounds, with the first round consisting of zoos being picked by a team of judges based on submitted press materials, which resulted in 15 semifinalists. Rounds two and three were done by fans in an online vote. In November 2004, Tulsa Zoo was declared the winner of the polls, and was awarded the grant.

Expansion packs

Endangered Species

On October 18, 2005, Microsoft released the Zoo Tycoon 2: Endangered Species expansion pack. This expansion pack adds more rare animals, including the koala, gray wolf, Komodo dragon, scimitar-horned oryx, American bison and orangutan, as well as a number of new forms of transportation, including sky trams, jeep tours and elevated paths. The expansion also has a feature called "variant skins", which means that when the player adopts an animal, it may look different from normal members of its species (such as a White tiger and King Cheetah).

African Adventure

Zoo Tycoon 2: African Adventure, released in May 16, 2006, adds various new African animals such as the bongo, secretarybird, ratel, and meerkat, and allows the player to drive through exhibits with African-themed jeep tours to get closer to them. The expansion pack also includes new maps based on well-known African locations, as well as new desert-themed buildings, lizard live food, and a new set of challenges and campaigns. The jeep vehicle tours originally included in Endangered Species are featured in this expansion, with the addition of the new Jeep Liberty.

Dino Danger Pack (premium download)
The Dino Danger Pack was released at the end of July 2006. The pack could only be downloaded from the Zoo Tycoon website via credit card. It added four new animals to the game: Tyrannosaurus, Triceratops, Carnotaurus, and Styracosaurus, as well as new objects to be used for them and a campaign game. The Dino Danger Pack could be purchased and downloaded at Zoo Tycoon premium downloads. Since the release of Zoo Tycoon 2: Extinct Animals, which includes more updated versions of all of the animals included in the pack, Dino Danger was taken offline from the Zoo Tycoon website and can no longer be downloaded there. However, other sites still offer this pack.

Zookeeper Collection
The Zookeeper Collection was released on October 17, 2006. Rather than being an expansion, it is more of a large combination pack featuring the Endangered Species and African Adventure expansions, as well as all animals and content from Zoo Tycoon 2.

Marine Mania

Released on October 17, 2006, Zoo Tycoon 2: Marine Mania features 20 new aquatic animals, new marine options, marine shows and several other new gaming features. The expansion also includes marine plants, the ability to build tanks, animal shows, mini games to teach some of the player's marine animals behaviors, and four new aquatic biomes (reef, coastal, pelagic, and benthic), and new scenarios and challenges. Changes have been made to the original method of biome layout allowing the ability to turn off rocks, flowers and/or trees, as well as enhancing water effects and improving the way animals move through water in a 3D space, updating the animals from the DLC, as well as various semi-aquatic animals from the base game, such as Nile crocodiles and polar bears. New animals range from the giant whale sharks to the tiny rockhopper penguins.

Extinct Animals

Zoo Tycoon 2: Extinct Animals was released on October 17, 2007. It is the latest expansion in the Zoo Tycoon series, with 34 adoptable animals and one bonus animal. The player can find fossils, or get staff to find them. The player can then assemble the fossils, and can also create normal and "Super" extinct animals in an extinct research lab. The player can also stop rampaging dinosaurs.

Ultimate Collection 
Ultimate Collection contains the original game, all four official expansions and a new menu theme exclusive to it, similar to Zoo Tycoon: Complete Collection. This title was released on September 30, 2008. Some users reported disk problems, whereby the third disk was the same as the second one. Microsoft sent free disk replacements at their support site.

Microsoft subsequently licensed the game to Ubisoft, who re-released the Ultimate Collection in a variety of formats across multiple territories including a single disk DVD-ROM for Windows PCs.

Reception

According to The NPD Group, Zoo Tycoon 2 was the 19th-best-selling computer game of 2004. It rose to 13th place on NPD's annual computer game sales chart for 2005, a position it maintained for 2006.

The game received generally positive reviews. IGN gave the game a 7.5/10 praising the game's lasting appeal while criticizing the game for being too easy, while GameSpy noted the improved 3D graphics.

Zoo Tycoon 2 received a "Silver" sales award from the Entertainment and Leisure Software Publishers Association (ELSPA), indicating sales of at least 100,000 copies in the United Kingdom.

Reboot 
A reboot of the franchise, titled Zoo Tycoon, and developed by Frontier Developments was released in 2013 for the Xbox 360 and Xbox One consoles. An enhanced edition titled Zoo Tycoon: Ultimate Animal Collection was released in 2017 for the Xbox One and Windows 10. Zoo Tycoon 2 was cited as a major influence, and Frontier Developments hoped the game would be a homage to the previous game, while enhancing the core experience. The entry was met with mixed reviews, with many citing the loss of customizability compared to the previous games.

Cancelled sequel 
After the success of Zoo Tycoon 2, preliminary design work was started on a third game. The game was canceled as the company shifted direction away from PC development and towards mobile and social games. Former Blue Fang Games designer Shawn Stone stated that he sees the influence of, and many ideas from the scrapped Zoo Tycoon 3, in the franchise's spiritual successor Planet Zoo.

References

External links
Official site

2004 video games
Blue Fang Games games
Games for Windows certified games
Interactive Achievement Award winners
MacOS games
Microsoft games
Mobile games
Video game sequels
Video games developed in the United States
Video games with expansion packs
Windows games
Zoo Tycoon
Windows Mobile games
MacSoft games
Video games about animals
Video games set in zoos
Single-player video games
D.I.C.E. Award for Family Game of the Year winners
Gamebryo games